Irish may refer to:

Common meanings
 Someone or something of, from, or related to:
 Ireland, an island situated off the north-western coast of continental Europe
Éire, Irish language name for the isle
 Northern Ireland, a constituent unit of the United Kingdom of Great Britain and Northern Ireland
 Republic of Ireland, a sovereign state
 Irish language, a Celtic Goidelic language of the Indo-European language family spoken in Ireland
 Irish people, people of Irish ethnicity, people born in Ireland and people who hold Irish citizenship

Places
 Irish Creek (Kansas), a stream in Kansas
 Irish Creek (South Dakota), a stream in South Dakota
 Irish Lake, Watonwan County, Minnesota
 Irish Sea, the body of water which separates the islands of Ireland and Great Britain

People
 Irish (surname), a list of people
 William Irish, pseudonym of American writer Cornell Woolrich (1903–1968)
 Irish Bob Murphy, Irish-American boxer Edwin Lee Conarty (1922–1961)
 Irish McCalla, American actress and artist Nellie McCalla (1928–2002)
 Irish Meusel, American Major League Baseball player Emil Meusel (1893–1963)
 Irish McIlveen, Northern Ireland-born American Major League Baseball player Henry McIlveen (1880–1960)

Other uses
 Irish (game), historical tables game that was the predecessor of backgammon

Language and nationality disambiguation pages